The Public Offices (Candidacy and Taking Up Offices) (Miscellaneous Amendments) Ordinance 2021 is an ordinance to amend the Oaths and Declarations Ordinance and other relating legislation which adds new requirements for the Chief Executive, Executive Council members, Legislative Council members and judges and other judicial officers, imposes oath-taking requirements on District Council members, and specifies requirements for candidates to swear to uphold the Basic Law and bear allegiance to the Hong Kong Special Administrative Region when assuming office or standing for election and also adds new grounds and mechanism for disqualification from holding the office or being nominated as a candidate. The ordinance was seen as another round of the Beijing authorities to bar the opposition from standing in elections or holding public offices and also raised concerns on the bill's vague parameters of the oath with such over-reaching scope would undermine Hong Kong's judicial independence.

Background
Article 104 of the Basic Law of Hong Kong and the Oaths and Declarations Ordinance originally stated that five categories of public officers, Chief Executive, principal officials, members of the Executive Council  and of the Legislative Council, judges of the courts at all levels and other members of the judiciary must "swear to uphold the Basic Law of the Hong Kong Special Administrative Region of the People's Republic of China and swear allegiance to the Hong Kong Special Administrative Region of the People's Republic of China" when assuming office. However, penalty for violating the oath was not specified in the laws, and the District Councillors were not included in the categories.

In the 2016 New Territories East by-election for the Legislative Council, pro-independence activist Edward Leung ran for the office and fared a better-than-expected result by obtaining more than 15 per cent of the popular vote. In the following general election in September, the returning officers unprecedentedly invalidated Edward Leung and five other localists' nominations for their pro-independence inclination. The decision was challenged by the leading lawyers in Hong Kong, who questioned whether returning officers had the power to investigate the "genuineness" of candidates' declarations and accordingly disqualify their candidacies. In their joint statement, it wrote that "[the Section 40 of the Legislative Council Ordinance] does not give the returning officer any power to inquire into the so-called genuineness of the candidates' declarations, let alone making a subjective and political decision to disqualify a candidate without following any due process on the purported ground that the candidate will not genuinely uphold the Basic Law." It also wrote that "arbitrary and unlawful exercise of powers by government officials ... are most damaging to the rule of law in Hong Kong."

In the end, there were still six localist candidates who ran on the "right to self-determination" of Hong Kong got elected with 19 per cent of total vote share. Two localist legislators-elect, Baggio Leung and Yau Wai-ching of Youngspiration used the largely ritual oath-taking ceremony on the inaugural meeting of the Legislative Council on 12 October 2016 to protest, asserting  "as a member of the Legislative Council, I shall pay earnest efforts in keeping guard over the interests of the Hong Kong nation," displayed a "Hong Kong is not China" banner, and mispronounced "People's Republic of China" as "people's re-fucking of Chee-na". As a result, Leung and Yau, as well as some other pro-democrats' oaths were invalidated by the Legislative Council President Andrew Leung. Chief Executive Leung Chun-ying and Secretary for Justice Rimsky Yuen also launched a judicial review against the duo. On 7 November 2016, the National People's Congress Standing Committee (NPCSC) controversially interpreted Article 104 of the Basic Law of Hong Kong to "clarify" the requirements that the legislators need to swear allegiance to Hong Kong as part of China when they take office, stating that a person "who intentionally reads out words which do not accord with the wording of the oath prescribed by law, or takes the oath in a manner which is not sincere or not solemn" should be barred from taking their public office and cannot retake the oath. As a result, Baggio Leung and Yau Wai-ching were unseated by the court, followed by four other opposition legislators, Leung Kwok-hung, Nathan Law, Lau Siu-lai and Yiu Chung-yim who were also disqualified for their oath-taking manner on 14 July 2017.

Another wave of disqualification of opposition candidates occurred in the subsequently postponed 2020 Legislative Council election, where 12 opposition candidates including four incumbent legislators Alvin Yeung, Kwok Ka-ki, Dennis Kwok and Kenneth Leung and also four incumbent District Councillors Tiffany Yuen, Lester Shum, Fergus Leung and Cheng Tat-hung were also barred from running. Despite Chief Executive Carrie Lam's reassurance on the four incumbent legislators' eligibility to serve in the extended Legislative Council term, the National People Congress Standing Committee (NPCSC) on 11 November 2020 ruled in a decision which barred Legislative Council members from supporting Hong Kong independence, refusing to recognise Beijing's sovereignty over Hong Kong, seeking help from "foreign countries or foreign forces to interfere in the affairs of the region" or committing "other acts that endanger national security", targeting the four sitting legislators. On the same day, the SAR administration announced that four legislators had been stripped of their seats with immediate effect. In response, the 15 remaining pro-democracy legislators announced they would resign en masse in solidarity with the disqualified members, leaving the legislature with virtually no opposition.

On 30 June 2020, the National People Congress Standing Committee (NPCSC) imposed the national security law on Hong Kong, which stipulates that a candidate who stands for election or assumes public office shall confirm in writing or take an oath to uphold the Basic Law and swear allegiance to the Hong Kong Special Administrative Region in accordance with the law besides other new restrictions, which required the amendment to the existing local legislation to implement the new requirements imposed by the NPCSC.

Contents
According to the government's press release, the bill mainly comprises the following six key areas of amendments which seek to: 
 amend the Interpretation and General Clauses Ordinance to add the legal requirements and conditions of "upholding the Basic Law and bearing allegiance to the Hong Kong Special Administrative Region" with reference to the 2016 NPCSC Interpretation, the  national security law and the 11 November 2020 NPCSC's "Decision on Issues Relating to the Qualification of the Members of the Legislative Council of the Hong Kong Special Administrative Region";
 impose an oath-taking requirement for District Council members which would be required with the same criteria as other public officers under Article 104 of the Basic Law; 
 lay out the concrete oath-taking requirements in the Oaths and Declarations Ordinance, including that the oath-taking should comply with the oath-taking procedure and ceremony; an oath taker who intentionally reads out words which do not accord with the wording of the oath prescribed by law, or takes the oath in a manner which is not sincere or not solemn, shall be treated as declining to take the oath. The oath so taken is invalid and the oath taker is disqualified forthwith from assuming the public office; 
 specify the arrangement of the oath administrator by standardising the arrangement for the Chief Executive or a person authorised by the Chief Executive to administer the oaths for Executive Council members, Legislative Council members, judges and other judicial officers, and District Council members;
 amend the Legislative Council Ordinance and the District Councils Ordinance to specify that a person who has breached an oath, or failed to fulfil the legal requirements and conditions on upholding the Basic Law and bearing allegiance to the Hong Kong Special Administrative Region will be disqualified from holding the office; and provide for the mechanism in case of such a breach or failure; and 
 introduce restriction in Chief Executive, Legislative Council and District Council elections such that persons who have been disqualified from entering on an office for declining or neglecting to take an oath, breached an oath or failed to fulfill the legal requirements and conditions on "upholding the Basic Law and bearing allegiance to the Hong Kong Special Administrative Region", would be disqualified from being nominated or elected in the relevant elections held within five years.

Concerns
Some concerns regarded the "negative list" which proscribed unpatriotic acts in the bill was far too vague and could put judges and politicians under intense pressure if their rulings or voting patterns were viewed as challenging the government. The bill intended to include the community-level District Councilors to be scrutinised for their oath-taking manners, was expected to pave the way for mass disqualification of the pro-democracy councillors who humiliated Beijing when they won District Council election by a landslide in 2019 amid the historic anti-government protests. The ranks of judges in Hong Kong, including leading foreign jurists, must also take oaths to Hong Kong under long-standing requirements, would also come under the new layer of outside political scrutiny. "These references are extremely vague and it creates more possible complications for how the judiciary itself has to regulate judges against these new standards," University of Hong Kong law professor Simon Young said. "There is still time to clarify things... the point is we should not be defining these specific parameters of the oath in such vague ways with such over-reaching scope that it could undermine judicial independence."

Passage
The Public Offices (Candidacy and Taking Up Offices) (Miscellaneous Amendments) Bill 2021 was passed by a 40-to-1 vote in the pro-Beijing-dominated legislature on 12 May 2021, with Civic Passion's Cheng Chung-tai the only one voted against. Chief Executive Carrie Lam on 20 May signed the bill into the law which came into effect after it is published in the Gazette on 21 May.

Effects

Resignations
In the past six months before the bill passage, dozens of opposition District Councillors resigned for refusal to take an oath under the new law. In early July 2021, the government reportedly considered banning 230 councillors to take oath of office and would asked them return their accrued salaries which worth around a million dollars. Such reports triggered a mass resignation of more than 260 councillors, while eight other had been unseated as they were in custody or had left the city.

Disqualifications
The government began the oath-taking ceremonies for the District Councillors from September 2021, and said it would consider the past conduct of the oath-takers when reviewing whether their pledges of allegiance are sincere. Following four oath-taking ceremonies starting in early September, oaths taken by 49 District Councillors were ruled invalid without any explanation, leaving more than 70 per cent seats in the 18 District Councils vacant. Under the amended Oaths and Declarations Ordinance, the disqualified District Councillors would be banned from standing in elections for the next five years, including former Democratic Legislative Councillor Roy Kwong and James To and some other Democrats who had expressed their interest in running in the upcoming Legislative Council election in December.

Responses
On 21 October 2021, UK Foreign Secretary Liz Truss issued a statement on the disqualification of District Councillors in Hong Kong, expressing its concern on the disqualifications of 55 District Councillors and resignations of over 250 who were pressured for political reasons. "The Hong Kong SAR Government must uphold freedom of speech and allow the public a genuine choice of political representatives," the statement wrote.

The United States also slammed the mass qualification. "These retroactive and targeted disqualifications, based on the Hong Kong authorities’ arbitrary determination that these district councillors' loyalty oaths are invalid, prevent people in Hong Kong from participating meaningfully in their own governance," US State Department spokesman Ned Price said on 21 October.

In the 21 October statement, an EU spokesperson said that the expulsions and resignations negate the results of the 2019 District Council election and had weakened Hong Kong's "democratic governance structure". "The protection of civil and political rights in Hong Kong is a fundamental part of the 'One Country, Two Systems' principle, which the EU supports," the spokesperson said. "The EU calls on China to act in accordance with its international commitments and its legal obligations and to respect Hong Kong’s high degree of autonomy and rights and freedoms."

References

External links
 Public Offices (Candidacy and Taking Up Offices) (Miscellaneous Amendments) Bill 2021

2021 in Hong Kong
2021 in law
Oaths
Politics of Hong Kong
Political repression in Hong Kong
Hong Kong legislation
Human rights in Hong Kong